Torma is a small borough in Jõgeva Parish, Jõgeva County, Estonia. As of the 2011 Census, the settlement's population was 396. In 2019, the population was found to have decreased to 383.

References

Boroughs and small boroughs in Estonia
Populated places in Jõgeva County
Jõgeva Parish
Kreis Dorpat